Polycera herthae is a species of sea slug, a nudibranch, a shell-less marine gastropod mollusc in the family Polyceridae.

Distribution 
This species was described from Curacao and Antigua. It also occurs in Cuba, Florida, Costa Rica and the Bahamas.

References

Polyceridae
Gastropods described in 1963